Tin Town is an unincorporated community in southeastern Polk County, Missouri, United States, located on Route 215.

The town had previously been known as Gold and renamed for numerous homes (at the time) with tin for roofs.  Tin Town is the boyhood home of Rock-A-Billy star Ronnie Self. Tin Town is part of the Springfield, Missouri Metropolitan Statistical Area.

References

Unincorporated communities in Polk County, Missouri
Springfield metropolitan area, Missouri
Unincorporated communities in Missouri